Aguayo may refer to:
 Aguayo (cloth), a multicolored woolen cloth, part of the traditional dressing in the Andes region
People:
 Agustin Aguayo, American deserter from the Iraq War
 Albert Aguayo (born 1934), Canadian neurologist 
 Irma Aguayo, Chicano Park muralist and activist
 Isolina Ferré Aguayo (1914–2000), Puerto Rican nun
 James B. Aguayo-Martel (born 1955) is an American scientist and physician
 Juan Vicente de Güemes Padilla Horcasitas y Aguayo, 2nd Count of Revillagigedo (1740–1799), Spanish military officer and viceroy of New Spain
 Luis Aguayo (born 1959), baseball player and coach
 Luis Alberto Ferré Aguayo (1904–2003), Governor of Puerto Rico
 Marquis de San Miguel de Aguayo, Mexican governor
 Miguel Mancera Aguayo (born 1932), Mexican economist
 Perro Aguayo (1946–2019), famous Mexican wrestler
 Perro Aguayo Jr. (1979–2015), Mexican professional wrestler
 Raul Aguayo, Dominican Republic sailor
 Roberto Aguayo, American football placekicker
 Sergio Aguayo (born 1947), Mexican academic and human rights activist